Manoel Nunes (March 7, 1895 – May 31, 1977), also known as Neco, was an association football midfielder. With great skill and tenacity, he was the first idol of Corinthians, being the first player to get a statue in the team's gardens (in 1929). As of 2006, Neco is the player who played the longest for Corinthians: 17 years.

Called often to the Brazil national team, he won two South American Championships: 1919 (team's top scorer) and 1922 (top scorer). Playing for Corinthians, he won the Paulista League eight times as a player (being top scorer in 1914 and 1920) and once as a coach (1937).

Neco had a quick temper and frequently got involved in fights; his second stint as a manager occurred because he was suspended as a player for 18 games when he beat a referee.

He started in the third team of Corinthians at the age of 16 and joined the first team in 1913 (the first year Corinthians participated in official competitions). In 1915, Corinthians did not play official games because of political issues and almost went bankrupt; this year, Neco played friendlies for Corinthians and the official games for Mackenzie. During this time, he broke into the Corinthians building to retrieve books that the landlord had locked inside due to non-payment of the rent.

After scoring two goals playing for Brazil against Uruguay in the 2x2 tie valid for the 1919 South American Championship in Rio de Janeiro, Neco returned to his regular job as a carpenter in São Paulo and was fired for missing work.

Statistical career overview

Player
Teams:
 1917–1922: Brazil (14 matches / 9 goals / official internationals only)
 1913–1914: SC Corinthians Paulista
 1915: AA Mackenzie College
 1916–1930: SC Corinthians Paulista

Honours:
 Copa América: 1919, 1922
 Campeonato Paulista: 1914, 1916, 1922, 1923, 1924, 1928, 1930

Top Scorer:
 Copa América: 1919 (4 goals)
 Campeonato Paulista: 1914 (12 goals)
 Campeonato Paulista: 1920 (24 goals)

Coach
Clubs:
 SC Corinthians Paulista : 1920, 1927, 1937–38
Honours:
 Campeonato Paulista: 1937

External links
Profile at cbf.com.br

1895 births
1977 deaths
Footballers from São Paulo
Brazilian footballers
Brazil international footballers
Sport Club Corinthians Paulista players
Association football midfielders
Brazilian football managers
Sport Club Corinthians Paulista managers
Copa América-winning players
Association football forwards